Trials of the State: Law and the Decline of Politics is a 2019 book by UK author, historian and former senior judge Jonathan Sumption, Lord Sumption, in which the content of his BBC's Reith Lectures have been published in book form. Sumption's lectures were delivered in front of a studio audience and were followed by question and answer sessions. Sumption used transcriptions of these lectures (with some notable changes) to prepare the book.

The central thesis of the book is Sumption's argument that in recent years, judicial law has undermined legislation and political process. This is because he argues that in political realms, rather than in courts, there is more accountability, especially from the public. 

In the book, Sumption expresses his concern that judges can be allowed to circumvent parliamentary legislation and can review the merits of policy decisions, and the trouble with giving judges this power is they are not constitutionally accountable to anyone for what they do. In his view, this is particularly problematic when it comes to human rights laws, which "transforms controversial political issues into questions of law for the Courts. In this way it takes critical decision-making powers out of the political process’.

References

External links 
Jonathan Sumption at The Reith Lectures, BBC 4

2020 non-fiction books
English-language books
Books about politics of the United Kingdom
Books by Jonathan Sumption, Lord Sumption
Profile Books books